Canned Heat is the debut studio album by American blues and rock band Canned Heat, released shortly after their appearance at the 1967 Monterey Pop Festival. The album consists of covers of traditional and popular blues songs.

Canned Heat was re-released on CD in 1999 by French label MAM Productions under the title Rollin' and Tumblin'.

Track listing

Personnel

Canned Heat 
 Bob Hite – lead vocals (except on “Help Me”)
 Alan Wilson – rhythm and slide guitar, lead vocals on “Help Me”, harmonica
 Henry Vestine – lead guitar
 Larry Taylor – bass
 Frank Cook – drums

Additional musicians 
 Ray Johnson (brother of Plas Johnson) – piano

References

1967 debut albums
Canned Heat albums
Liberty Records albums